Pelageya Aleksandrovna Danilova (4 May 1918 – 31 July 2001) was a Russian artistic gymnast. She competed at the 1952 Summer Olympics, finishing within top 12 in all artistic gymnastics events, and winning one gold and one silver medal.

After marriage she changed her last name to Demirdzhiyan. In 1953 she graduated from the Institute of Physical Education in Saint Petersburg and after retirement worked as a gymnastics coach, first with Burevestnik and then as a head coach of Lokomotiv. In the 1970s she worked with the national team of Bulgaria.

References

External links
 Pelageya Danilova's grave 

1918 births
2001 deaths
people from Pskov Oblast
People from Pskovsky Uyezd
Gymnasts at the 1952 Summer Olympics
Olympic gymnasts of the Soviet Union
Olympic gold medalists for the Soviet Union
Olympic silver medalists for the Soviet Union
Olympic medalists in gymnastics
Soviet female artistic gymnasts
Medalists at the 1952 Summer Olympics
Medalists at the World Artistic Gymnastics Championships